Prank Encounters is an American horror-themed hidden camera streaming television series. It is a prank show recorded with hidden cameras. Each episode pairs two members of the public, strangers to one another, who are unwittingly introduced to each other by show actors, under the ruse of a tryout for a new job. Subsequently, a sequence of scares orchestrated by Gaten Matarazzo occur in order to scare the participants for comedic value, with Matarazzo adapting the prank via headsets fed to the actors on the fly.

The first 8-episode season debuted on October 25, 2019, on the streaming service Netflix. A second season was released on April 1, 2021, and consisted of 7 episodes.

Cast
 Jack Crawford
 David Storrs
 Mary Gallagher
 Sven Holmberg
 Julian Gant
 Peter Giles
 Olivia DeLaurentis
 Gaten Matarazzo

Episodes

Season 1 (2019)

Season 2 (2021)
Due to the ongoing COVID-19 pandemic in the United States, this series was recorded with limited social distancing and was filmed during late 2020 and early 2021. The participants and actors were tested for COVID-19 before recording. The series was released on April Fool's Day, in respect of the show's theme of pranking.

Release
Prank Encounters was released on October 25, 2019, on Netflix streaming.

Reception 
The show has received negative reviews. Some viewers of the show have accused the reactions to the pranks of being entirely staged.

The Daily Dot had unfavorably compared the series to Punk'd and criticized the reactions, stating "Netflix's Prank Encounters is a riff on Punk'd, but it doesn't do anything to set itself apart. [...] The reactions from the people getting pranked (who are not supposed to be actors) are so formal and stiff that it feels like watching bad improv."

Controversy 

When the series was announced back in June 2019, there was controversy regarding the premise of the show being disrespectful towards people in search of employment. A spokesperson for Netflix stated that individuals involved were financially compensated for their time and had fun being in the show. When the series launched later in October, the executive producer of the show, Kevin Healey, reassured to Entertainment Weekly that individuals pranked were aware the job they took was only for one night, and that they were indeed paid afterward. Matarazzo also responded to the initial controversy when the show was announced on his Instagram account. Matarazzo stated, "Thank you guys for your concern for these people. It means so much to me and the rest of the producers of the show. We hope you enjoy the show, and we are very excited to show you all what we've created [...]."

In March 2020, it was reported that Healey's former co-executive producer, Scott Hallock, sued him for creating a show that was similar to their series, Scare Tactics.

References

External links 

2019 American television series debuts
2021 American television seasons
2010s American reality television series
2010s American horror comedy television series
American hidden camera television series
English-language Netflix original programming
Practical jokes